Axtell is an unincorporated community in the Sevier Valley on the southwestern edge of Sanpete County, Utah, United States.

Description

The community is located on the U.S. Route 89 between the cities of Centerfield and Salina. The town was settled in 1870 under the name of Willowcreek (being located along the Willow Creek). It was renamed for Utah's former territorial governor Samuel Beach Axtell in 1891.

See also

References

External links

Unincorporated communities in Sanpete County, Utah
Unincorporated communities in Utah
Populated places established in 1870
1870 establishments in Utah Territory